John Henry Quantick (6 July 1909 – 1972) was a Welsh football right-back. He was born in Cwm.

Quantick signed for West Bromwich Albion in 1930 from Ebbw Vale, but left to join Dudley Town without making his league debut. In 1933 he joined Hull City where he played 88 league games before leaving to join Worcester City.

References

1909 births
1972 deaths
Welsh footballers
West Bromwich Albion F.C. players
Hull City A.F.C. players
Worcester City F.C. players
Association football defenders
Ebbw Vale F.C. players
Dudley Town F.C. players